The 50th Anniversary Collection: The Copyright Extension Collection, Volume 1 is the first collection by Bob Dylan that Sony Music released to prevent the recordings from legally entering the public domain in Europe. The album features studio and live recordings from 1962 that have not previously been commercially released. Sony reportedly released only 100 copies each of the four-CD-R "1962" set. The set was released only in Europe.

Track listing

Tracks 1–10 recorded 24 April 1962 at 1st The Freewheelin' Bob Dylan session
Tracks 11–21 recorded 25 April 1962 at 2nd The Freewheelin' Bob Dylan session
Tracks 22–26 recorded 9 July 1962 at 3rd The Freewheelin' Bob Dylan session

Tracks 1–2 recorded 9 July 1962 at 3rd The Freewheelin' Bob Dylan session
Tracks 3–9 recorded 26 October 1962 at 4th The Freewheelin' Bob Dylan session
Tracks 10–16 recorded 1 November 1962 at 5th The Freewheelin' Bob Dylan session
Tracks 17–19 recorded 14 November 1962 at 6th The Freewheelin' Bob Dylan session
tracks 20–25 recorded 6 December 1962 at 7th The Freewheelin' Bob Dylan session

Tracks 1–2 from the Mackenzie Home Tapes, recorded 29 January 1962
Tracks 3–6 from the Mackenzie Home Tapes, recorded Fall 1962
Tracks 7–11 recorded 16 April 1962 at Gerde's Folk City
Tracks 12–23 recorded 2 July 1962 at Finjan Club, Montreal

Tracks 1–5 recorded 22 September 1962 at the Carnegie Hall Hootenanny
Tracks 6–12 recorded 15 October 1962 at the Gaslight Cafe

See also
 The Beatles Bootleg Recordings 1963, 2013 compilation of recordings by The Beatles also released to prevent recordings from entering the public domain
 Ashcan copy, comic book industry term for a work published solely for copyright purposes

Notes

References

External links
Why There Are Only 100 Copies Of The New Bob Dylan Record
Sony Issues The 'Bob Dylan Copyright Collection Volume' Solely To Extend Copyright On Dylan's Work
Bob Dylan releases just 100 copies of 'The 50th Anniversary Collected'
Bob Dylan 50th Anniversary Collection gets limited European release
Sony Issues Dylan CDs to Extend Copyright
2012
2013

2012 compilation albums
Bob Dylan compilation albums
Sony Music compilation albums
2012 live albums
Bob Dylan live albums
Sony Music live albums
Albums produced by Tom Wilson (record producer)
Albums produced by John Hammond (producer)
Albums recorded at Carnegie Hall
Copyright extension compilation albums